Mordechai Shmuel Ashkenazi (1943 – January 14, 2015) was an Orthodox rabbi and a member of the Chabad Hasidic movement. Rabbi Ashkenazi was the chief rabbi of the Chabad community of Kfar Chabad, Israel from 1983 until his death, and was an authority on Halacha (Jewish law).

Rabbi of Kfar Chabad
Rabbi Askenazi served as the Kfar Chabad community's chief rabbi (מרא דאתרא (Marah D'Asra)), meaning "Master of the place" in ancient Judeo-Aramaic. Rabbi Ashkenazi was the spiritual and religious leader for the Kfar Chabad community.

Halachic stances
Rabbi Ashkenazy was widely cited in the Orthodox Jewish press for declaring that long wigs were inappropriate for use as a hair covering under the halachik definition of tzniut.

Family
He was a grandson of Rabbi Meir Ashkenazi, former chief rabbi of Shanghai. His son Schneur became the chief rabbi of Rishon L'tzion, Israel.

References

External links
 Speech by Ashkenazi
 
 
 
 
 
 

21st-century Israeli rabbis
Israeli Hasidic rabbis
Chabad-Lubavitch rabbis
2015 deaths
1943 births
20th-century Israeli rabbis